The Pahranagat pebblesnail also known as the Pahranagat Valley turban snail, scientific name Fluminicola merriami, is a species of very small or minute freshwater snail with an operculum, an aquatic gastropod mollusk in the family Lithoglyphidae. This species is endemic to the United States.

References

Lithoglyphidae
Gastropods described in 1892
Endemic fauna of the United States
Taxonomy articles created by Polbot